The Montana National Guard consists of the Montana Army National Guard, and the Montana Air National Guard.

Structure and mission 
When National Guard troops are called to federal service, the President serves as Commander-in-Chief. The federal mission assigned to the National Guard is: "To provide properly trained and equipped units for prompt mobilization for war, National emergency or as otherwise needed."

The Governor may call individuals or units of the Montana National Guard into state service during emergencies or to assist in special situations which lend themselves to use of the National Guard. The state mission assigned to the National Guard is: "To provide trained and disciplined forces for domestic emergencies or as otherwise provided by state law."

Montana Air National Guard units include the 120th Fighter Wing and the 219th RED HORSE Squadron.

References

External links
Bibliography of Montana Army National Guard History compiled by the United States Army Center of Military History
 Montana National Guard Magazine - Big Sky Guardian printed by AQP Publishing, Inc
Montana National Guard News

National Guard (United States)
Military in Montana
State agencies of Montana